The Raptors 905 are a Canadian professional basketball team in the NBA G League based in Mississauga, Ontario, and are affiliated with the Toronto Raptors. Raptors 905 began play in the 2015–16 season and play their home games at Paramount Fine Foods Centre, replacing the Centre's former basketball tenant, the Mississauga Power of the National Basketball League of Canada. The team regularly plays approximately 2-4 home games at the Scotiabank Arena, the home of their parent club, the Toronto Raptors. The Raptors 905 is the eighth NBA G League team to be owned by an NBA team and the first NBA G League team to be located outside of the United States.

The name "905" refers to the local area code of the suburban Greater Toronto Area, and is a common shorthand referring to the suburbs surrounding Toronto.

History 
In 2008, Raptors president and general manager Bryan Colangelo said that Maple Leaf Sports & Entertainment Ltd. (MLSE) was considering launching an NBA Development League franchise in the Toronto area within a couple of years to serve as a developmental team for the Raptors. Hamilton's Copps Coliseum and Oshawa were reportedly under consideration to host the franchise.  However, a Canadian-based franchise posed difficulties due to tax and visa issues, and Rochester, New York, which is just across the United States border, was considered as an alternative.

In April 2015, Colangelo's replacement Masai Ujiri announced that MLSE's board had approved purchasing a franchise, and that they were in negotiations with the NBA over where the team would play and whether it could be launched in time for the 2015-16 season.  In June 2015 it was announced that MLSE had purchased a D-League franchise, which would be named the Raptors 905 and would begin play that fall at the Hershey Centre in Mississauga, Ontario, a suburb of Toronto.  The team is named after the area code used by much of suburban Greater Toronto Area.  The franchise reportedly cost $6 million.  An agreement was negotiated with the Mississauga Power of the National Basketball League of Canada, which held the basketball lease at the Hershey Centre, with the Power folding. The team planned to play some games at Toronto's Air Canada Centre, home of their NBA affiliate the Toronto Raptors.

On July 7, 2015, Jesse Mermuys was hired as head coach and Dan Tolzman as general manager. Mermuys left his position as an assistant coach under Toronto Raptors head coach, Dwane Casey. On July 28, 2015, veteran coach Tim Lewis was named lead assistant coach. On November 4, 2015, Raptors 905 unveiled their new uniforms and an alternate logo.

On June 13, 2016, it was reported that Mermuys would leave the 905 for the LA Lakers, joining them as an assistant coach. In September, the Raptors announced that Jerry Stackhouse would be the head coach of the Raptors 905 team.

In 2016–17, the 905 finished with a 39–11 record (the second best record in G-League history) clinching their first division title and with a record of 21–4 on the road (a D-League record). Stackhouse was awarded the Coach of the Year, while Center Edy Tavares was awarded Defensive Player of the Year. Making their way to the playoffs as the top seed, they swept the Canton Charge in the first round and then swept the Maine Red Claws in the second, clinching their first conference title. In the finals, they met the Western Conference champion Rio Grande Valley Vipers whom they beat in three games and claimed their first title in franchise history. Pascal Siakam was named the Finals MVP after recording 32 and 17 points in Games 2 and 3 respectively.

Season-by-season

Current roster

Alumni
The following players have appeared in the NBA:

Head coaches

Awards

Most Valuable Player
Lorenzo Brown (2018)
Chris Boucher (2019)

Finals MVP
Pascal Siakam (2017)

Defensive Player of the Year
Edy Tavares (2017)
Chris Boucher (2019)
Gary Payton II (2021)

Coach of the Year
Jerry Stackhouse (2017)

All Stars
Ronald Roberts (2016)
Scott Suggs (2016)

Axel Toupane (2016, 2017)

Edy Tavares (2017)

All League teams
Edy Tavares (2017 First team)
Axel Toupane (2017 Third team)
Lorenzo Brown (2018 First team)
Chris Boucher (2019 First Team)
Jordan Loyd (2019 First team)

Henry Ellenson (2021 Second Team)

Malachi Flynn (2021 Second team)

Alize Johnson (2021 Second team)

All Defensive League teams
Edy Tavares (2017)

Chris Boucher (2019)

Gary Payton II (2021)

All Rookie teams

Malachi Flynn (2021)

Slam Dunk Champion
John Jordan (2016)

Jason Collier Sportsmanship Award
Scott Suggs (2016)

Most Improved Player
Axel Toupane (2016)

Executive of the Year
Chad Sanders (2021)

Franchise of the Year
 (2019-20)

NBA affiliates
Toronto Raptors (2015–present)

References

External links
 

 
2015 establishments in Ontario
Sport in Mississauga
Toronto Raptors
Maple Leaf Sports & Entertainment
Basketball teams established in 2015